Filip Dujmović (born 12 March 1999) is a Bosnian professional footballer who plays as a goalkeeper for Liga II club Dinamo București.

Club career
Born in Livno, Dujmović started playing in the youth levels of Zrinjski Mostar where he called the attention of Bosnian giant Željezničar which brought him to the club's youth team in 2017. His impressive performances earned Dujmović a year later a move to Turkish side Adana Demirspor where he played for their youth team in the U21 1. Lig where he made 24 appearances in the 2018–19 season.

In the summer of 2019, Dujmović was ready for senior football, and he returned to Bosnia whare he signed with ambitious side Mladost Doboj Kakanj playing in the Bosnian Premier League, but, even before he could make a debut, Serbian side Spartak Subotica showed interest in loaning him, an offer immediately accepted. Dujmović made his debut in 2019–20 Serbian SuperLiga shortly after. In July 2020, he permanently joined Spartak.

In January 2022, Dujmović moved to FK Radnički Niš.

In August 2022, he signed a contract with Romanian club Dinamo București.

International career
Dujmović represented Bosnia and Herzegovina on both the under-17 and under-21 youth levels.

Career statistics

Club

References

External links
Filip Dujmović at Sofascore

1999 births
Living people
Sportspeople from Livno
Association football goalkeepers
Bosnia and Herzegovina footballers
Bosnia and Herzegovina youth international footballers
Bosnia and Herzegovina under-21 international footballers
FK Mladost Doboj Kakanj players
FK Spartak Subotica players
FK Radnički Niš players
FC Dinamo București players
Serbian SuperLiga players
Liga II players
Bosnia and Herzegovina expatriate footballers
Expatriate footballers in Turkey
Bosnia and Herzegovina expatriate sportspeople in Turkey
Expatriate footballers in Serbia
Bosnia and Herzegovina expatriate sportspeople in Serbia
Expatriate footballers in Romania
Bosnia and Herzegovina expatriate sportspeople in Romania
Croats of Bosnia and Herzegovina